Callac is a commune in the Côtes-d'Armor department in Brittany in north-western France.

Geography

Landmarks
 Botmel Chapel
 Naous statue, by Georges Lucien Guyot
 Callac Church
 Roman bridge

Population
Inhabitants of Callac are called Callacois in French.

See also
Communes of the Côtes-d'Armor department

References

External links

Official website 
 Joseph Lohou's internet site about Callac de Bretagne
 Géographie de Bretagne, portail des villes et pays bretons - Callac / Kallag
 Information on Callac and Questellic

Communes of Côtes-d'Armor